Lynn Township, Illinois may refer to one of the following townships:

 Lynn Township, Henry County, Illinois
 Lynn Township, Knox County, Illinois

See also

Lynn Township (disambiguation)

Illinois township disambiguation pages